Tsibermanovo is a rural locality (a settlement) in Nizhnesuyetsky Selsoviet, Suyetsky District, Altai Krai, Russia. The population was 66 as of 2013. There are 2 streets.

Geography 
Tsibermanovo is located 27 km west of Verkh-Suyetka (the district's administrative centre) by road. Nechayevka is the nearest rural locality.

References 

Rural localities in Suyetsky District